Odysseas Phokas (1857 in Romania – 1946 in Athens)  was a Greek painter, whose work focused on landscape painting.

Biography 
He was born in Romania at 1857 and at 1876 he left for France to study Law in Aix-en-Provence, according to his parents' wishes. Later he began his studies on painting at the Open Academies of Paris with teachers such as Karl Cartier (1855-1925) and Raphael Collin (1850-1916).

At 1885 he moved to Athens and began working as an artist at the magazine To Asty and at the newspaper Akropolis. At the Olympic competition of 1888 he was awarded with the bronze medal, and he competed again at 1896. At the 1900 Paris World Fair he was awarded again with the bronze medal.

From 1900 until 1940, he took part in many art exhibitions in Athens. At 1902 he exhibited his works at Smyrna, while at 1905 and at 1909 he did exhibitions in Alexandria. From 1907 up until 1910 he lived, for family reasons, in Romania, where he also exhibited his works. From 1915 until his death, he worked as curator and art restaurateur at the National Gallery of Athens.

Artistic work 
Phokas, even if he studied under representators of the French Academism Movement, with his works he is credited amongst many others as an ambassador of Impressionism in Greece. His Landscape paintings are noted for their sensitivity and their diffused light, which contrasts the darkness of the Academists. Main sources of his artworks were landscapes of Attica and Romania. At 1917 and at 1919 he took part in the exhibits of the Nikolaos Lytras' team "Tehni" , however, without ever becoming a member of the team. From 1915 until the end of his life he worked at the National gallery of Athens, in which with his will passed on all his properties along with his own private art collection.

References 

1857 births
1946 deaths
Impressionism
Greek expatriates in Romania
19th-century Greek painters
20th-century Greek painters
Greek landscape painters